This is a list of Sheriffs and High Sheriffs of Leicestershire, United Kingdom. The Sheriff is the oldest secular office under the Crown. Formerly the High Sheriff was the principal law enforcement officer in the county but over the centuries most of the responsibilities associated with the post have been transferred elsewhere or are now defunct, so that its functions are now largely ceremonial. Under the provisions of the Local Government Act 1972, on 1 April 1974 the office previously known as Sheriff was retitled High Sheriff. The High Sheriff changes every March.

For a period prior to 1566 the Sheriff of Warwickshire was also the Sheriff of Leicestershire. After some years as part of Leicestershire, Rutland was split away in 1996 as a Unitary Authority with its own shrievalty. Thus there is a separate High Sheriff of Rutland (an office that existed prior to 1974 as the Sheriff of Rutland).

Sheriffs of Leicestershire

11th century – 16th century
c.1066: Hugh de Grandmesnil
1098: Ivo de Grandmesnil
 1158 – 1566 See Sheriff of Warwickshire

17th century

18th century

19th century

20th century

High Sheriffs of Leicestershire

20th century

21st century

References
 List of High Sheriffs

 
Leicestershire
People from Leicestershire
Local government in Leicestershire
Leicestershire-related lists